D'Arcy Drollinger (born January 17, 1969) is an American actor, writer, musician, director, producer & choreographer known for his high-camp / vaudeville-style stage productions and films that combine slapstick, farce and often drag. He was a founding member of the post-punk art band Enrique.  He is the owner of the San Francisco nightclub Oasis.  Drollinger is also the creator of the dance-fitness brand, Sexitude.

Career

Film 
D'Arcy wrote, directed and starred in his first feature film in 2020, based on original play, Shit & Champagne. The screenplay brings many of the [stage]show’s characters, storyline and jokes largely intact to the cinematic version, with Drollinger playing stripper Champagne White. The comedy is a tribute to female empowerment and the low-budget exploitation films of the 1970's.

The Oasis 
The Oasis, a theater and cabaret nightclub located in San Francisco's SOMA district,  hosted a grand opening event on New Year's Eve day 2014. D'Arcy and business partners, including drag personality, Heklina, signed a deal to purchase the former Oasis nightclub in October 2014. The nightclub's diverse programming features drag stars, cabaret and performing artists, live musical acts, and DJs. Drollinger went on to become sole owner, reopening Oasis after the pandemic, in June of 2021.

Theatrical productions 

In 1993, Drollinger's first full length musical, The Cereal Killers was produced at the Artful circle Theater in San Francisco.  The production included many members of Enrique and was directed by Charles Herman-Wurmfeld.  Drollinger and Wurmfeld went on to collaborate on two other rock musicals, The Possession of Mrs. Jones and Suburbia 3000.   Drollinger mounted the long-running cult hit, Above and Beyond the Valley of the Ultra Showgirls in 1997 before moving to New York City in 1998.  While living in Manhattan, Drollinger wrote and produced Pink Elephants, Scalpel! and Shit & Champagne, in which he also starred. After returning to San Francisco in 2011, Project : Lohan, Mr. Irresistible, were written.  At the same time Drollinger began producing and directing live parodies of television sitcoms with long time friend and drag star, Heklina.  After the venue they had been performing in was sold they decided to open Oasis, their own performance venue. After opening Oasis Drollinger wrote and starred in two sequels to Shit & Champagne, Champagne White and The Temple of Poon' and Disastrous. Followed by the 1980s soap opera spoof, Bitch Slap.

 Sexitude 
Sexitude is an ongoing body-positive, sex-positive dance/fitness program created by Drollinger in 2011 in San Francisco, California. Drollinger taught the first class at the Academy of Ballet on August 7, 2011, as he desired as class that would be "fun, relaxed, and a good workout, both physically and mentally."  Since then, Sexitude classes have happened in local San Francisco area dance schools such as Dance Mission, City Dance and ODC.   As a performance group, Sexitude has participated in number of performances in the San Francisco Area, including Daytime Realness at El Rio, the Castro Theatre, and the Main Stage of San Francisco Pride. The group has worked with Drollinger as a professional drag queen as well as provided performances for programs organized by Peaches Christ.

 Enrique 
In 1988, while attending San Francisco State University, Drollinger and artist Jason Mecier formed the performance art band, Enrique.  The groups comedic stage antics and often twisted take on 1970s TV nostalgia, landed their first gig opening up for the Average White band at The Kennel Club in San Francisco.  The over-the-top stage productions won them a loyal San Francisco following from the late 1980s to mid 1990s.

 Plays/musicals 
 The Cereal Killers (1993)
 The Possession of Mrs. Jones (1996)
 Suburbia 3000 (1997)
 Above and Beyond the Valley of the Ultra Showgirls (1997/2003/2016/2017)
 Pink Elephants (2000)
 Scalpel! (2003/2010)
 Shit & Champagne (2006/2014/2015)
 Project: Lohan (2012)
 Mr. Irresistible (2014)
 Champagne White and the Temple of Poon (2015)
 Disastrous! (2016)
 B*tch Slap! (2017)

 Parody adaptations (stage) 
 Designing Women Friends Golden Girls Roseanne Sex and the City Star Trek Three's Company Buffy the Vampire Slayer Films 
 Shit & Champagne'' (2020)

References

External links 

Sexitude
SF Oasis
Sexitude with Baby D YouTube Channel
Shit & Champagne at IMDb

1969 births
Living people
American male writers
American male musicians
American musical theatre directors
American choreographers
San Francisco State University alumni
American drag queens
Male actors from San Francisco
Writers from San Francisco
21st-century LGBT people